The Life I Know is metalcore band Gwen Stacy's first full-length album released under Ferret Music. It was released on February 5, 2008.  On November 30, they posted "The Path To Certainty" from their new album on their Myspace. The album leaked onto torrents on January 7, 2008. The first single was "The Fear In Your Eyes." The music video for the single "The Fear In Your Eyes" was released and shown on MTV2's Headbangers Ball. The artwork was designed by Sons of Nero.

Track listing

 "The Path to Certainty" – 3:01
 "I Was Born With Two First Names" – 4:00
 "Challenger Pt. 2" – 3:22
 "If We Live Right, We Can't Die Wrong" – 4:13
 "What Will Happen If I Hit Enter" – 3:25
 "The Fear In Your Eyes" – 3:34
 "Playing God Is Playing For Keeps" – 2:58
 "Falling From the Fence" – 3:18
 "Sleeping In the Train Yard" – 7:17
 "Gone Fishing. See You In a Year" – 4:48
 "Paved Gold With Good Intentions" – 2:53
 "I'll Splatter You Like Jackson Pollock" – 3:39

2009 digital re-release bonus tracks

 "Intro" – 0:20
 "The Way It Should Be" – 3:07
 "All Those Who Are Flawless, Raise Your Hand (or Don't)" – 4:15
 "Hey God, This Song's For You. I Hope You Like It" – 4:50
 "Jeremiah Buys a Field" – 4:24
 "Haven't Felt Too Well in a While" – 3:25
 "Hoy Empezamos una Vida Nueva" – 8:32

References

External links 
 Gwen Stacy at Ferretstyle.com
Photoshoot for the layout of The Life I Know

Gwen Stacy (band) albums
2008 albums
Albums with cover art by Sons of Nero